Cinzia Petrucci (born 28 October 1955 in Rome) is a former Italian shot putter. She won one medal, at senior level, at the International athletics competitions.

Career
She competed at the 1980 Summer Olympics in Moscow, USSR. There she ended up in 14th and last place, with a distance of 17.27 metres.

Olympic results

National titles
Cinzia Petrucci has won 15 times the individual national championship.
8 wins in the shot put (1973, 1974, 1975, 1976, 1977, 1978, 1980, 1981)
7 wins in the shot put indoor (1973, 1974, 1975, 1978, 1980 1981, 1982)

See also
 Italian all-time lists - Shot put

References

External links
 

1955 births
Living people
Italian female shot putters
Athletes (track and field) at the 1980 Summer Olympics
Olympic athletes of Italy
Athletes from Rome
Mediterranean Games bronze medalists for Italy
Athletes (track and field) at the 1979 Mediterranean Games
Mediterranean Games medalists in athletics